Pohjanmaa-class may refer to: